The 1987 Giro d'Italia was the 70th edition of the Giro d'Italia, one of cycling's Grand Tours. The Giro began in San Remo, with a prologue individual time trial on 21 May, and Stage 10 occurred on 31 May with a stage to Termoli, followed by a rest day. The race finished in Saint-Vincent on 13 June.

Prologue
21 May 1987 — San Remo,  (ITT)

Stage 1a

Stage 1b
22 May 1987 — Poggio di San Remo to San Remo,  (ITT)

Stage 2
23 May 1987 — Imperia to Borgo Val di Taro,

Stage 3
24 May 1987 — Lerici to Camaiore,  (TTT)

Stage 4
25 May 1987 — Camaiore to Montalcino,

Stage 5
26 May 1987 — Montalcino to Terni,

Stage 6
27 May 1987 — Terni to Monte Terminillo,

Stage 7
28 May 1987 — Rieti to Roccaraso,

Stage 8
29 May 1987 — Roccaraso to San Giorgio del Sannio,

Stage 9
30 May 1987 — San Giorgio del Sannio to Bari,

Stage 10
31 May 1987 — Bari to Termoli,

Rest day
31 May 1987

References

1987 Giro d'Italia
Giro d'Italia stages